NNPC Limited is a for profit oil company in Nigeria. Formerly a government-owned corporation, it was transformed from a corporation to a limited liability company in July 2022. NNPC Limited is the only entity licensed to operate in the country's petroleum industry. It partners with foreign oil companies to exploit Nigeria's fossil fuel resources.

History

NNPC was established on 1 April 1977 as a merger of the Nigerian National Oil Corporation and the Federal Ministry of Petroleum and Energy Resources. NNPC by law manages the joint venture between the Nigerian federal government and a number of foreign multinational corporations, which include Royal Dutch Shell, Agip, ExxonMobil, TotalEnergies, Chevron, and Texaco (now merged with Chevron). Through collaboration with these companies, the Nigerian government conducts petroleum exploration and production. In 2007, the head of the Nigerian wing of Transparency International said salaries for NNPC workers were too low to prevent graft.

The NNPC Towers in Abuja is the headquarters of NNPC. Consisting of four identical towers, the complex is located on Herbert Macaulay Way, Central Business District Abuja. NNPC also has zonal offices in Lagos, Kaduna, Port Harcourt and Warri. It has an international office located in London, United Kingdom. In October 2019, NNPC stated that it had signed a $2.5 billion pre-payment agreement with Nigeria LNG for upstream gas development projects.

In December 2021, the Federal Government of Nigeria and the Nigeria National Petroleum Corporation (NNPC) Ltd signed a N621 billion Memorandum of Understanding to finance the construction of critical road infrastructure in Nigeria.

Following passage of a Petroleum Industry Act in August 2021, the government of Nigeria announced on July 19, 2022, that NNPC will "now operate as a commercial entity without relying on government funding and direct controls". NNPC was established as a limited liability corporation in the hopes that a private entity will find it easier to access international capital markets. The company will continue to bear responsibility for distributing and selling fuel in Nigeria, but the state will now assume the responsibility of subsidizing the cost of fuel.

Leadership
President Buhari appointed Mele Kyari  as the new Group Managing Director (GMD) now known as the Group Chief Executive Officer of NNPC. Kyari replaces Maikanti Baru. The new GMD and the other appointed NNPC officials would work alongside the current officers in the same position until the 7 July 2019.

Dr. Maikanti Baru (7 July 1959 – 29 May 2020) was the former Group Managing Director (GMD). He was appointed Group Managing Director on 4 July 2016, under the presidency of Muhammadu Buhari; he succeeded Dr. Emmanuel Ibe Kachikwu, the Nigerian Minister of State for Petroleum (2015–2019).

Organisational structure
The NNPC's business operations are managed through Strategic Business and Corporate Services Units (SBUs/CSUs) in diverse locations across Nigeria. In that case; The Nigerian National Petroleum Corporation initiated a recruitment scheme and since then, until date the NNPC recruitment have been a yearly scheme.

The NNPC Group comprises the NNPC Board, the group managing director's office, Seven operational units as listed below. Each of the units is headed by a chief operating officer (COO). Its divisions are headed by group general managers (GGM), while its subsidiary companies are headed by managing directors. NNPC has several subsidiaries, two partly owned subsidiaries and 16 associated companies.

Autonomous Business Units:
Upstream Company
Downstream Company
Refining Company
Ventures Company
Gas & Power Company
Corporate Services Units:
Finance and Accounts
Corporate Services

Strategic Business & Corporate Services Units:

NNPC acquired Oando's OVH Energy in September 2022 and took over it's 380 filling stations.

Installations
NNPC has sole responsibility for upstream and downstream developments, and is also charged with regulating and supervising the oil industry on behalf of the Nigerian Government. In 1988, the corporation was commercialised into 11 strategic business units, covering the entire spectrum of oil industry operations: exploration and production, gas development, refining, distribution, petrochemicals, engineering, and commercial investments. On Wednesday July 10, 2019 at a meeting of Nigeria’s revenue generating and monitoring agencies with the leadership of the Senate at the National Assembly Complex, Abuja, the group's managing director, Mele Kyari called for adequate funding of the petroleum sector. The subsidiary companies include the Nigerian Petroleum Development Company (NPDC).

Legal premise

According to the Nigerian constitution, all minerals, gas, and oil the country possesses are legally the property of the Nigerian federal government. As such, the oil corporations operating in Nigeria appropriate portions of their revenue to the government, which accrues nearly 60% of the revenue generated by the oil industry in this manner. The revenue gained by the NNPC accounts for 76% of federal government revenue and 40% of the entire country's GDP. As of 2000, oil and gas exports account for 98% of Nigerian export earnings.

Corruption at the NNPC

KPMG Report
In December 2011, the Nigerian government permitted a forensic report conducted by KPMG to be published. The audit, commissioned by the Ministry of Finance following concerns over the NNPC's transparency, detailed the NNPC's sharp business practices, violation of regulations, illegal deductions of funds belonging to the state, and failure to account for several billions of naira that should go to the federation account.

Auditors found that between 2007 and 2009 alone, the NNPC over-deducted funds in subsidy claims to the tune of N28.5 billion. It has not been able to account for the sum ever since.

Willbros Group Inc
In May 2008, Willbros Group Inc, a US company, admitted to making corrupt payments totalling over $6.3 million to officials at the NNPC and its subsidiary NAPIMS, in return for assistance in obtaining and retaining contracts for work on the Eastern Gas Gathering System (EGGS).

ABB Vetco Gray
In July 2004, ABB Vetco Gray, a US company, and its UK subsidiary ABB Vetco Gray UK Ltd, admitted to paying over $1 million in bribes to officials at NNPC subsidiary NAPIMS in exchange for obtaining confidential bid information and favourable recommendations from Nigerian government agencies.

Trafigura and Vitol
In November 2013 after a report was published by Swiss Non-governmental advocacy organisation – Erklärung von Bern – allegations of heavy fraud surfaced, placing the NNPC under suspicion of siphoning off $6.8 billion in crude oil revenues.

Unremitted funds (2013–2014)
On 9 December 2013, a letter from the Central Bank of Nigeria Governor, Sanusi Lamido Sanusi to the President of Nigeria, Goodluck Ebele Jonathan, dated show of 25 September 2013 details that the NNPC had not remitted over $49.8 billion proceeds of crude oil sales to the Government surfaced. On 13 December 2013, NNPC responded that no money was missing. Reconciliation Committee (comprising representatives of (i) CBN (ii) NNPC (iii) DPR (iv) FIRS (v) OAGF (vi) The Budget Office of the Federation (vii) Federal Ministry of Finance (viii) Federal Ministry of Petroleum Resources) was set up.

The Reconciliation Committee estimated unremitted funds at $10.8bn on 18 December 2013 while CBN changed its claim to $12bn. CBN then informed senate committee on Finance on 4 February 2014 that NNPC needs to account for $20bn as the CBN could only confirm receipt of $47bn out of $67bn revenue for the period under review. The then Finance Minister recommended the conduct of an independent Forensic Audit and PwC was officially appointed by the office of the Auditor General of the Federation (AuGF) to conduct a forensic audit into the allegations.

Among the conclusions reached by PwC at the end of their work, as stated in their report, which was made public are:

1. Total cash remitted into the Federation accounts in relation to crude oil liftings was $50.81bn and NOT $47bn as earlier stated by the Reconciliation Committee for the period from January 2012 to July 2013.

2. NNPC has provided information on the difference leading to a potential excess remittance of $0.74 billion (without considering expected remittances from NPDC). Other indirect costs of $2.83 billion which were not part of the submission to the Senate Committee hearing have
been defrayed to arrive at this position.

3. A major consideration centres on the ownership of oil and gas assets controlled by NPDC. Subject to additional information being provided, we estimate that the NNPC and NPDC should refund to the Federation Account a minimum of $1.48billion as summarised in the
next page.

No staff of the NNPC or Ministry of Petroleum has so far been punished, though on Thursday, 20 February 2014, the whistle-blowing CBN Governor was suspended from office by the President.

Unremitted funds (2016)
An official audit reported in March 2016 that the NNPC had failed to pay .

References

External links

Oil and gas companies of Nigeria
Government-owned companies of Nigeria
Nigeria
Energy companies established in 1977
Non-renewable resource companies established in 1977
1977 establishments in Nigeria
Economy of Abuja